Bernard Lechowick is an American television writer and producer. He grew up in Mentor, Ohio and is a father of two sons, Richard Latham Lechowick and Vincent Latham Lechowick. Lechowick graduated from the University of Notre Dame. For his graduate studies, he chose University of Texas at Austin to complete a master's degree in Radio, Television and Film, and it is there that he met his wife, Lynn Marie Latham.

He began his writing partnership with his wife, L. M. Latham, in 1979. In 1984, their primetime serial, Berrenger's, aired on NBC. When the show was cancelled after a few months on the air, Lechowick received job offers to write for Dallas, Knots Landing and Falcon Crest. He and his wife studied the offers and decided to go with Knots Landing.

Positions held 
The Young and the Restless: Creative Consultant (May 2, 2007 – December 24, 2007); Breakdown Writer (May 2, 2007 – December 19, 2007); Script Writer (August 28, 2006 – December 18, 2006; May 14, 2007 – December 2007)
Wild Card (Co-Creator, Writer, Executive Producer)
Live Through This (Executive Producer)
That's Life (Consulting Producer)
Hyperion Bay (Co-Executive Producer)
Savannah (Writer)
Hotel Malibu (Co-Creator, Writer, Executive Producer)
Second Chances (Co-Creator, Writer, Executive Producer)
Homefront (Co-Creator, Writer, Executive Producer) (Homefront was inducted into The Museum of Television & Radio in March 1998)
Wolf Lake (Executive Producer)
Knots Landing (Writer, Producer)
Berrenger's (Story editor)
Mama Malone (Script Writer)
Brilliant But Cancelled: The Perfect Pitch
Que Pasa, U.S.A.? (Director)

Awards and nominations 
Lechowick has been nominated for 3 Primetime Emmy Awards, 2 Daytime Emmys, 2 Writers Guild of America Award, 1 Viewers for Quality Television Awards, and 1 Imagen Foundation Awards.

References 

Soap opera producers
American male television writers
American soap opera writers
American television producers
University of Notre Dame alumni
Moody College of Communication alumni
Living people
Year of birth missing (living people)